This article lists described species of the family Asilidae start with letter F.

A
B
C
D
E
F
G
H
I
J
K
L
M
N
O
P
Q
R
S
T
U
V
W
Y
Z

List of Species

Genus Filiolus
 Filiolus alenkae (Lehr, 1995)
 Filiolus baratovi (Lehr, 1995)
 Filiolus kamkalensis (Lehr, 1995)
 Filiolus lopatini (Lehr, 1967)
 Filiolus serkovae (Lehr, 1995)
 Filiolus tarbagataicus (Lehr, 1995)
 Filiolus tchernovi (Lehr, 1995)
 Filiolus tugajorum (Lehr, 1961)

Genus Furcilla
 Furcilla dorothyae (Martin, 1975)
 Furcilla petila (Martin, 1975)

References 

 
Asilidae